The 2022–23 Big Ten men's ice hockey season will be the 33rd season of play for the Big Ten Conference's men's ice hockey division and will take place during the 2022–23 NCAA Division I men's ice hockey season. The regular season is set to begin on October 1, 2022, and conclude on February 25, 2023. The conference tournament is scheduled to begin in early March, 2023.

Head coaches

Coaching changes

Michigan State 
On April 12, 2022, former Michigan State head coach Danton Cole was fired. On May 23, 2022, Adam Nightingale was named head coach for the Spartans.

Michigan 
During the 2022 offseason, Michigan's head coach, Mel Pearson, was accused of mistreating both players and staff during his tenure with the Wolverines. On August 5, 2022, Pearson was fired. Because the vacancy happened so close to the start of the next season, the Wolverines were not able to perform a typical hiring search. On August 7, 2022, Michigan promoted assistant coach Brandon Naurato to interim head coach for the 2022–23 season.

Records

Standings

Non-Conference record 
Of the sixteen teams that are selected to participate in the NCAA tournament, ten will be via at-large bids. Those 10 teams are determined based upon the PairWise rankings. The rankings take into account all games played but are heavily affected by intra-conference results. The result is that teams from leagues which perform better in non-conference are much more likely to receive at-large bids even if they possess inferior records overall.

The Big Ten performed tremendously well in non-conference games. All seven league members had winning records against other conferences and more than half were at or better than .700. On aggregate, only Hockey East had a winning record against the Big Ten but that was only by 1 game. The overwhelming win/loss totals enabled the Big Ten to have as many as 6 of its member teams ranked in the top 16 during the season.

Regular season record

Statistics

Leading scorers 
GP = Games played; G = Goals; A = Assists; Pts = Points; PIM = Penalty minutes

Leading goaltenders 
Minimum 1/3 of team's minutes played in conference games.

GP = Games played; Min = Minutes played; W = Wins; L = Losses; T = Ties; GA = Goals against; SO = Shutouts; SV% = Save percentage; GAA = Goals against average

Ranking

USCHO

USCHO did not release a poll in weeks 1 and 13.

USA Today

Pairwise

Note: teams ranked in the top-10 automatically qualify for the NCAA tournament. Teams ranked 11-16 can qualify based upon conference tournament results.

Conference tournament

Awards

Big Ten

References

External links
official website

2022-23
Big Ten
2022-23